Robin Frijns (born 7 August 1991) is a Dutch motor racing driver. He is the 2012 Formula Renault 3.5 Series champion, and the first driver to have won the series in his debut season since Robert Kubica in 2005. Frijns is currently competing in Formula E driving for Team ABT and in the FIA World Endurance Championship for Team WRT. Frijns achieved his first Formula E podium finish in his second outing in the category, and claimed his maiden victory at the 2019 Paris E-Prix. In 2021 Frijns won the 24 Hours of Le Mans in the LMP2 class driving for Team WRT, alongside Ferdinand von Habsburg and Charles Milesi.

Career

Karting 
Born in Maastricht, Netherlands, Frijns has been an active kart racer in Belgium and France. In 2008, he finished third in the KF2 European Championship category and runner-up in the French Championship, at the same level.

Formula BMW 
Frijns began his formula racing career in the 2009 Formula BMW Europe season with Josef Kaufmann Racing. He finished third overall in the championship, with a win at Silverstone and six podiums. He also finished as the highest-placed rookie in the championship.

Formula Renault

Formula Renault 2.0

2010 
Frijns made his first attempt at Formula Renault 2.0, racing at the Spa-Francorchamps round of the 2010 Northern European Cup. Driving for Josef Kaufman Racing once more, Frijns finished second in the first race of the meeting, fifth in the second race, and won the third.

2011 
In 2011, Frijns joined the Eurocup Formula Renault 2.0 championship full-time, continuing to drive for Josef Kaufman Racing. He won the title on his first attempt, winning five races over the course of the season – including both races at Silverstone – and finishing forty-five points ahead of his nearest rival, Carlos Sainz Jr.

Frijns also competed in the Northern European Cup, finishing the season fourth overall, despite missing the Oschersleben, Most and Monza rounds of the championship. Over the course of the season, he won one race and finished on the podium seven times.

Formula Renault 3.5 
In 2012, Frijns made the transition to the Formula Renault 3.5 Series – the highest tier of the World Series by Renault – this time racing for British team Fortec Motorsports. As in 2011, Frijns won the title on his first attempt, winning races at Motorland Aragón, the Moscow Raceway and the Hungaroring, and scoring five podiums and four poles over the course of the season.

Frijns' title came amidst controversy when he was involved in a collision with rival driver Jules Bianchi in the final race of the season in Barcelona. Bianchi passed Frijns at the start of lap 21, and he quickly came under more pressure from Carlin driver Kevin Magnussen. Magnussen made an attempt to pass Frijns at the Repsol corner, but Frijns moved to block him. The move forced Bianchi wide, and he skirted across the gravel trap and into the wall and retirement. Frijns went on to finish the race in seventh place, but race stewards decided that he had caused an avoidable collision and twenty-five seconds were added to his race time, demoting him to fourteenth place. As Bianchi had failed to score, and fellow title rival Sam Bird had failed to score enough points, Frijns' title remained intact. In the days following the meeting, Bianchi accused Frijns of intentionally running him off the road, a charge which Frijns denied.

GP2 Series 

After an impressive test with Mercedes' DTM team, Frijns was not offered a drive with the manufacturer. Frijns instead opted to try for a GP2 seat, and tested with veteran team Trident Racing and new team Russian Time. Frijns showed impressive pace and Trident's team principal Maurizio Salvadori praised him and stated his intentions to have Frijns race for the team. However a lack of funding put him on the sidelines for the start of 2013 in Malaysia.

Before the second race in Bahrain, Frijns announced that he would race with new-for-2013 team Hilmer for the second event of the season, replacing Conor Daly and partnering Pål Varhaug. Frijns qualified in a very respectable 10th position ahead of pre-season favourite James Calado, but struggled to adapt to the new Pirelli tyres in the races, before a collision in the first race with Stéphane Richelmi whilst in a points-scoring position compromised his weekend. Team principal Franz Hilmer however was impressed with Frijns and hoped he could compete full-time with the team in 2013.

In only his second weekend, Frijns took a win and a second place at Circuit de Catalunya supporting the 2013 Spanish Grand Prix.

Formula One 
On 18 October 2012, Sauber announced that Frijns would be driving their car during the third round of Young Drivers Test in Abu Dhabi alongside the team's testing and reserve driver Esteban Gutiérrez. As the highest-placed Formula Renault driver not attached to any established Formula One team, Frijns was also added to Red Bull Racing's line-up for the test.

Reflecting on Frijns' 2012 season, ESPN commentator Ben Evans opined that "anything less than a Formula One race seat next year would be a travesty".

On 23 November 2012, it was announced that Robin Frijns would become part of Sauber, and would serve as test and reserve driver in 2013.

On 21 January 2014, Frijns confirmed that he will be a reserve driver for Caterham in the 2014 season.

Sports car racing 

In 2015, Frijns joined Belgium Belgian Audi Club Team WRT to drive an Audi R8 at the Blancpain GT Series, partnering with Laurens Vanthoor and Jean-Karl Vernay.

Formula E

2015–16 season 
On 24 August 2015, it was announced that Frijns would partner fellow former Sauber test driver Simona de Silvestro at Andretti for the 2015–16 Formula E season. He came 10th in his first race and scored a podium in Putrajaya.  Frijns finished in the points in the following two races making him the first Formula E rookie to finish his first four races in the top 10.  After four races, Frijns had scored all of Andretti's points tally of 21. He finished 12th in the standings.

2016–17 season 
Frijns was retained by Andretti for the 2016-17 Formula E season and partnered Antonio Felix da Costa.

2018–19 season 
After one season absent, Frijns joined Envision Virgin Racing for the 2018-2019 Formula E season, partnered by Sam Bird. The Envision Virgin Racing team, suffered a difficult start to the season in Ad Diriyah, with Frijns starting from 20th position on the grid, just behind teammate Bird. Frijns managed to make his way up to 12th. He took his first podium for the team at the Marrakesh E-Prix, coming very close to overtaking Mahindra Racing's Jérome d'Ambrosio, but ultimately finishing second. Frijns drove a controlled race in Santiago, finishing in fifth, whilst Bird took the race victory. A forgettable weekend came next in Mexico City, starting 20th, after both Envision Virgin Racing cars hit problems in qualifying, battling his way up to 11th. Teammate Sam Bird, took the chequered flag first in Formula E's 50th ePrix in Hong Kong, but was denied the win after being found guilty of hitting André Lotterer, dropping Bird down to 6th place. Venturi's Edoardo Mortara inherited the race victory, promoting Lucas di Grassi into second and crucially Frijns to third, for his second podium finish of the 2018-19 season. For the next race in Sanya, Frijns had run in the top 10 for the entirety of the race and was set for big points, until a tangle with Sébastien Buemi on the penultimate lap, ended Frijns' race after crashing heavily into Lucas di Grassi. Frijns finished P4, for the Rome ePrix, making use of Attack Mode to pass Buemi and Oliver Rowland. For the Paris ePrix, Frijns started from 3rd on the grid, behind Buemi and Rowland, but when both drivers hit trouble, he took the lead and dominated in tricky conditions, mastering torrential rain and hailstones. André Lotterer closed in on Frijns, who had a damaged front wing, towards the end of the race, but the Dutch driver did enough to hold on and win the ePrix. On the cool-down lap, Frijns stopped at a marshall's post to pick up a Dutch flag, which he revealed had been pre-agreed. At the next race in Monaco, Frijns had started towards the back of the grid, but made several overtakes, most notably one on Alex Lynn at Tabac, to get him into a top 10 position. He pushed his luck with the overtaking however and tried an ambitious move on Alexander Sims into Ste. Devote. It didn't pay off and it ended Frijns' race. In Berlin, Frijns had technical issues in the group qualifying stages and started plum-last in 22nd. Whilst he made progress, it wasn't enough for points and he languished in 13th. At the next race in Bern, Frijns was hit by Jérome d'Ambrosio, before they even got to the first corner. Frijns speared across the track and into Alex Lynn and was forced to retire with broken suspension. d'Ambrosio would receive a penalty for the collision. For the finale weekend in New York, Frijns would be challenging for the title, however in race 1, he was victim to the bumper-car style driving of his Formula E counterparts and was forced to retire from the race. For the second race, Frijns made it into the Superpole shootout and qualified second behind Alexander Sims. At the start of the race, Frijns lost second to Sébastien Buemi, but overtook the Nissan and the BMW i Andretti drivers to take his second ever Formula E victory. The win put him 4th in the drivers championship after a last-lap crash between Mitch Evans and Lucas di Grassi, also helping the Envision Virgin team take 3rd in the constructors championship from Nissan e.Dams.

2019–20 season 
Frijns remained with Envision for the 2019–20 Formula E season alongside Sam Bird again. Frijns started the season well taking 5th place after driving through the field in the first race of the 2019 Diriyah ePrix, but crashed out of the second race to record a DNF. During qualifying at the next race at Santiago, Frijns spun spectacularly whilst on his fast lap & consigned himself to the back of the grid. He struggled in the race & finished a lowly 15th. He returned to form at Mexico City & was running high up in the points & in podium contention until he was wiped out by the Mercedes EQ car of Nyck de Vries who was using Fanboost to attack Antonio Felix Da Costa. Frijns continued, albeit well down the order & was eventually disqualified having finished out of the top 10 anyway. In the next race in Marrakesh, Frijns made progress up the field but only finished 12th. He ended the season in 12th with 58 points.

2020–21 season 
Frijns remained with Envision for the 2020–21 season, alongside a new teammate, Nick Cassidy. He scored his first points of the season in round 2 in Diriyah with a pole position and a second place finish. He would match the second in monaco, taking it at the line from António Félix da Costa and finishing 0.024s infront. There were 2 fastest laps in the first Valencia and second London races, and finished the championship in 5th on 89 points.

2021–22 season 
Frijns stayed with Envision alongside Nick Cassidy for the 2021–22 season. Frijns finished 7th in the championship, with four podiums and 126 points.

2022–23 season 
After four straight seasons with Envision, Frijns switched to new team ABT Sportsline, teaming up with Nico Müller for the 2022–23 season. The season started at Mexico City, where, having qualified 20th, Frijns was involved in a collision with Norman Nato on the opening lap, which ended up breaking the Dutchman's left wrist and forced him to undergo surgery shortly after. As a result, Frijns missed the next round at Diriyah, held two weeks after Mexico, and was replaced by Kelvin van der Linde. Frijns also missed the third and fourth rounds at Hyderabad and Cape Town.

Deutsche Tourenwagen Masters 

On 29 January 2018, it was announced that Frijns will drive for Audi Sport in the 2018 Deutsche Tourenwagen Masters, replacing Mattias Ekström, who elected to focus solely on the FIA World Rallycross Championship.

2019 

Frijns partnered Nico Müller for the 2019 season at Audi Sport Team Abt Sportsline & finished 5th overall in the drivers championship down to his consistency more than results, having stood on the podium 5 times without a win.

2020 

In 2020 Frijns stayed at Audi Sport Team Abt Sportsline once again partnering Nico Müller. The 2020 season was his most successful season as of yet and saw Frijns take his maiden win in the DTM at his home circuit in Assen. He took a further two wins and 10 podiums to finish the season in third position right behind his teammate. At the end of the season Audi decided to end its official engagement in the DTM which resulted in Frijns leaving the championship.

FIA World Endurance Championship

2021 

On 21 January 2021, Team WRT announced it would enter an Oreca 07 in the FIA World Endurance Championship with Robin Frijns as one of its drivers. It was later announced he would share the car with Charles Milesi and Ferdinand Habsburg. After a difficult first race the team won the three last races, including the 2021 24 Hours of Le Mans, claiming the World Championship on their debut. Frijns was at the wheel of the car at the 24 Hours of Le Mans when the sister car stopped on the final lap while leading the race. He subsequently inherited the lead and was able to fend off the chasing Oreca 07 from Tom Blomqvist and win the race by just over 7 tenths of a second.

2022 
For the 2022 season Frijns remained at Team WRT, partnering Rene Rast and Sean Gelael. The season started out strongly, as after a second place in the 1000 Miles of Sebring Frijns and his teamamtes won the 6 Hours of Spa-Francorchamps, taking the championship lead in the process. However, despite the Dutchman taking pole for the 24 Hours of Le Mans at the following round, the team would be forced to retire from the race after Frijns crashed during the 18th hour. Another setback came at the subsequent 6 Hours of Monza, as a twelfth place meant that the team once again would miss out on points. Despite a strong end to the season, in which Frijns and his comrades took victories at Fuji, where Frijns experienced an issue with the team radio during the second part of the race, meaning that he couldn't communicate with his engineer, and Bahrain, the point-less middle part of the campaign meant that the team missed out on the championship to Jota, finishing second in the standings.

2023 
Frijns was retained by Team WRT for the 2023 season alongside Ferdinand Habsburg and Sean Gelael again.

Racing record

Racing career summary 

† As Frijns was a guest driver, he was ineligible for points.

Complete Formula BMW Europe results 
(key) (Races in bold indicate pole position; races in italics indicate fastest lap)

Complete Eurocup Formula Renault 2.0 results 
(key) (Races in bold indicate pole position) (Races in italics indicate fastest lap)

Complete Formula Renault 3.5 Series results 
(key) (Races in bold indicate pole position; races in italics indicate fastest lap)

Complete GP2 Series results 
(key) (Races in bold indicate pole position; races in italics indicate fastest lap)

Complete Formula One participations 
(key) (Races in bold indicate pole position; races in italics indicates fastest lap)

Complete Blancpain GT Series Sprint Cup results

Complete Formula E results 
(key) (Races in bold indicate pole position; races in italics indicate fastest lap)

† Driver did not finish the race, but was classified as he completed over 90% of the race distance.

Complete Bathurst 12 Hour results

Complete Deutsche Tourenwagen Masters results 
(key) (Races in bold indicate pole position) (Races in italics indicate fastest lap)

Complete FIA World Endurance Championship results 
(key) (Races in bold indicate pole position) (Races in italics indicate fastest lap)

* Season still in progress.

Complete 24 Hours of Le Mans results

References

External links 
 
 

1991 births
Living people
Sportspeople from Maastricht
Dutch racing drivers
Formula BMW Europe drivers
Formula Renault 2.0 NEC drivers
Formula Renault Eurocup drivers
FIA Institute Young Driver Excellence Academy drivers
World Series Formula V8 3.5 drivers
GP2 Series drivers
Blancpain Endurance Series drivers
24 Hours of Spa drivers
Formula E drivers
24 Hours of Daytona drivers
Deutsche Tourenwagen Masters drivers
24H Series drivers
ADAC GT Masters drivers
Stock Car Brasil drivers
WeatherTech SportsCar Championship drivers
FIA World Endurance Championship drivers
24 Hours of Le Mans drivers
Josef Kaufmann Racing drivers
Fortec Motorsport drivers
Hilmer Motorsport drivers
W Racing Team drivers
Andretti Autosport drivers
Audi Sport drivers
Abt Sportsline drivers
Envision Virgin Racing drivers
Jota Sport drivers
Phoenix Racing drivers
Nürburgring 24 Hours drivers
Cupra Racing drivers